Denis Malgin (born 18 January 1997) is a Swiss professional ice hockey centre currently playing for the Colorado Avalanche of the National Hockey League (NHL). Malgin was selected by the Florida Panthers in the fourth round, 102nd overall, of the 2015 NHL Entry Draft.

Playing career
Malgin made his National League A debut playing with ZSC Lions during the 2014–15 season. He was selected in the fourth round (102nd overall) in the 2015 NHL Entry Draft by the Florida Panthers.

On 25 July 2016, Malgin signed a three-year, entry-level contract with the Panthers.

Malgin made the Panthers' opening night roster for the 2016–17 season. He made his NHL debut on 13 October against the New Jersey Devils. His first career point, an assist, came in his second NHL game, against the Detroit Red Wings on 15 October. He scored his first NHL goal on 2 November against Tuukka Rask of the Boston Bruins. Malgin finished the season with ten points in 47 games. He also skated in 15 games for the Panthers' American Hockey League (AHL) affiliate, the Springfield Thunderbirds.

Malgin spent the entirety of the 2018–19 season with the Panthers, recording 16 points in 50 games. On 26 August 2019, the Panthers re-signed Malgin to a one-year contract extension.

During the 2019–20 season, Malgin registered 12 points in 36 games with the Panthers before he was traded to the Toronto Maple Leafs in exchange for forward Mason Marchment on 19 February 2020.

On 2 October 2020, Toronto re-signed Malgin to a one-year contract extension worth $700,000. He began the 2020–21 NL season with Lausanne HC on loan from the Leafs while the start of the North American was delayed due to the ongoing pandemic. Malgin was placed on waivers by the Leafs on 5 January 2021 in order to continue with Lausanne for the remainder of the season. On 2 May, Malgin was re-assigned to the Toronto Marlies of the AHL.

On 6 September 2021, Malgin returned to the ZSC Lions as a free agent, agreeing to a four-year deal.

On 13 July 2022, Malgin returned to the NHL, signing a one-year, $750,000 contract with the Toronto Maple Leafs. After a successful training camp and productive pre-season, finishing as one of the team's offensive leaders, Malgin made the Maple Leafs opening night roster to begin the  season. Malgin collected 4 points through 23 games before his tenure with the Maple Leafs ended as he was traded to the Colorado Avalanche in exchange for Dryden Hunt on 19 December 2022. He made his Avalanche debut, initially featuring on the third-line, in a 2-1 overtime victory over the Montreal Canadiens on 21 December 2022.

International play
Malgin competed for Switzerland at the 2015 IIHF World U18 Championships, where he was named to the 2015 IIHF World U18 Championship All-Star Team.

Personal life
Malgin's parents are originally from Russia. His father Albert played for teams in the Soviet Union before moving to Switzerland to continue his career. It was him who introduced Malgin to hockey; at age three, Malgin began skating with his father's team. Malgin's brother Dmitri is also a professional hockey player, currently playing in the 1ère ligue, the fourth tier league in Switzerland.

Growing up, Malgin returned to Perm, Russia, every summer, where his father is from. He grew up speaking Russian, though he learned Swiss German at school.

Career statistics

Regular season and playoffs

International

Awards and honors

References

External links

1997 births
Living people
Colorado Avalanche players
Expatriate ice hockey players in Canada
Expatriate ice hockey players in the United States
Florida Panthers draft picks
Florida Panthers players
GCK Lions players
Lausanne HC players
People from Olten
Ice hockey players at the 2022 Winter Olympics
Olympic ice hockey players of Switzerland
Sportspeople from the canton of Solothurn
Springfield Thunderbirds players
Swiss expatriate ice hockey people
Swiss　expatriate sportspeople in Canada
Swiss expatriate sportspeople in the United States
Swiss ice hockey centres
Swiss people of Russian descent
Toronto Maple Leafs players
ZSC Lions players